DYGM-TV (channel 13) is a television station in Bacolod City, Philippines, airing programming from the GMA network. Owned and operated by the network's namesake corporate parent, the station maintains studios and hybrid analog/digital transmitting facility at the 3/F iSecure Bldg. Rizal Cor. Locsin St., Bacolod.

History
Channel 10 Bacolod traced its history in 1969 as a Catholic television station owned by the Visayan Educational Radio and Television Association (or shortened as VERTA) under the leadership of the late Bacolod City Bishop Antonio Fortich (VERTA also owns its radio station, DYAF-AM (1143 kHz on AM band) at that time, with the latter is now under the membership of the Catholic Media Network, as "DYAF Radyo Veritas 1143 Bacolod"). It was closed down in the height of Martial Law declaration in 1972.

Three years later, in 1975, Channel 10 went back on air. This time it became an affiliate of Republic Broadcasting System using the "Magnitude 10" branding. However, in 1984, Magnitude 10 lasted for nine years when it closed off the air due to lack of funds needed to upgrade its facilities.

GMA's presence in Bacolod City was restored on April 30, 1992 when it became a relay station as GMA Channel 10 Bacolod, coinciding with GMA's Rainbow Satellite Network launch with the utilizes a logo to correspond with the rebranding and a satellite-beaming rainbow in a multicolored striped based on the traditional scheme of red, orange, yellow, green, blue, indigo and violet, with GMA in a metallic form uses a San Serif Century Gothic Extra Bold and analogous gloominess of Indigo as its fonts in the letters. Prior to the launch, the station conducted test broadcasts via the Channel 10 frequency from 1989 to 1991 using a low-powered transmitter covering parts of the Bacolod area, and on May 16, 1996, RBS was formally changed its corporate name to GMA Network Incorporated, with GMA now standing for Global Media Arts.

In 1998, GMA Bacolod's signal was increased to 10 kilowatts (via GMA's transmitter in Sipalay) and shared the same frequency with GMA Iloilo (Channel 6), while Channel 10 was closed down.  It simulcast the regional news program "Ratsada" and the variety program "Bongga!". However, the simulcast only lasted a year and GMA's signal was only available through cable affiliates.

In 2007, GMA Channel 10 Bacolod was reopened as an owned-and-operated relay station under the ownership of GMA Network Inc. On the following year, GMA Bacolod would later become one of the relay stations of GMA Channel 6 Iloilo.

On December 6, 2009, GMA Channel 10 Bacolod moved its frequency to Channel 13 in order to prevent its interference with ABS-CBN TV-10 Iloilo which is also receivable in Bacolod City. At the same time, GMA Bacolod became a satellite-selling station alongside GMA Bicol, GMA Northern Mindanao and GMA General Santos stations.

On November 22, 2010, GMA Bacolod launched its own news program Isyu Subong Negrense, which was initially aired as a replacement to GMA Iloilo's afternoon news program Ratsada, although it still simulcasted Arangkada in the morning slot. Later on, Ratsada was aired side by side with Isyu Subong, and once again stopped and make the latter as the regional network's flagship program until April 24, 2015.

On August 27, 2018, The resumption of the operations of GMA Iloilo as an originating station, GMA Bacolod is also re-upgrading as an originating station following co-producing and simulcasting its unified Hiligaynon newscast, One Western Visayas.

On March 18, 2019, GMA Bacolod opened its new studio set now used by One Western Visayas.

On May 11, 2021, GMA Bacolod started digital test broadcasts on UHF Channel 44 covering Metro Bacolod and the province of Negros Occidental.

GMA TV-13 Bacolod current programs
GMA Regional TV Early Edition (Simulcast to GMA Iloilo) (2020)
Masskara Festival (Annually)
One Western Visayas (Simulcast to GMA Iloilo) (2018)
Word of God Network (2016)

GMA TV-13 Bacolod past programs
 24 Oras Western Visayas
 Arangkada* (2007-2015)
 Bongga! (1999-2007)
 Isyu Subong Negrense - GMA Bacolod's flagship afternoon news & public affairs program (2010-2015)
 Let's Fiesta (2011-2015)
 Ratsada* (1999-2015)
 Saksi sa Western Visayas (simulcast on TV-6 Iloilo)
 Visita Iglesia (2010-2015)

Programs marked by (*) are simulcasts from GMA Iloilo

Digital television

Digital channels
UHF Channel 44 (653.143 MHz)

Area of coverage  
 Bacolod
 Negros Occidental
 Portion of Negros Oriental

On-air staff

Current 
Adrian Prietos as Anchor and News Correspondent of One Western Visayas and Host of GMA Regional TV Early Edition
Aileen Pedreso as Regional News Producers of One Western Visayas

Former 
Cristina Lizares Poblador-Magbojos
Gretchen Varela-Ochoa
Katherine Valencia (now with 103.1 Brigada News FM Bacolod)
Erwin Nicavera
Stephanie Azucena
Ariane Jane Gastaya
Darwisha Bonza Librado

Rebroadcasters

Since the return of GMA Bacolod as an Already originating station last September 27, 2021, the operations of GMA Bacolod (TV-13/30 Bacolod and TV-10 Sipalay) was absorbed by GMA Iloilo which led to simulcast One Western Visayas and other regional interstitial, as well as some of the editors and reporters are employed by the latter. GMA Bacolod was previously an originating station from 2010 to 2015, with its former program Isyu Subong Negrense.

See also
DYAQ-TV
DYEN
List of GMA Network stations
Visayan Educational Radio and Television Association - the original owner of the former Channel 10 frequency.

References

GMA Network stations
Television stations in Bacolod
Digital television stations in the Philippines
Television channels and stations established in 1969